The KTM Museum is a planned museum in Johor Bahru, Johor, Malaysia in the former Johor Bahru Railway Station building.

History
The museum was originally constructed as the Johor Bahru Railway Station in 1909. On 21 October 2010, it was closed and replaced by Johor Bahru Sentral railway station located adjacent to it. The old railway station was then turned into the KTM Museum, but never open for public.

Architecture
The museum building is painted in blue and yellow.

See also
 Johor Bahru Sentral railway station

References

Art Deco railway stations
Buildings and structures in Johor Bahru
Defunct railway stations in Malaysia
Railway stations opened in 1909
Railway stations closed in 2010
Museums in Johor